Gustave-Henri Jossot, also known as Abdul Karim Jossot (Dijon, France, 16 April 1866 – Sidi Bou Said, Tunisia, 7 April 1951), was a French caricaturist, illustrator, poster designer, Orientalist painter, writer and thinker.

Life and career
Jossot started his career under the guidance of Jean Paul Laurens and Eugène Carrière. His style as a cartoonist is immediately recognizable for its expressive reference to the Cloisonnism introduced by Émile Bernard. He travelled in Brittany and may have been influenced by the Pont-Aven school.

He is mainly remembered for the mark he left on several special issues of Paris journals, most notably l'Assiette au beurre, contributors to which included Kees van Dongen, Félix Vallotton, František Kupka, Steinlen, Adolphe Willette, and Jacques Villon.

Much of his work lampooned the bourgeoisie, as can be seen from the titles of the illustrated books he produced: Artistes et Bourgeois (Paris: Louis Michaud 1896); Jockey-Club Sardines (1897); Minces de trognes (Paris: Hazard, 1896); Viande de Bourgeois (Paris: Louis Michaud, 1906).

His work was shown at several major collective exhibitions in Paris: Salon des Cent (1894, 1895) Salon de la Société Nationale de Beaux Arts (1895); Salon d'Automne (1908, 1909, 1911); Salon des Indépendants (1894, 1896, 1910, 1911, 1921). His big exhibition in the Rudolphinum Muséum established his international stature in 1908, then in the Salon Tunisien of 1912. Although Jossot often said he had stopped all his artistics activities, he was still sending his works to the Salon Tunisien the day of his death.

At public auction in New York (12 June 1980) a painting of Jossot's was sold with the remarkable title "Anti Nabis" (ref: Bénézit 1999). This work, dated 1894, refers to Les Nabis, an important influence at the time.

Convictions and conversion

Jossot was branded an anarchist, which he denied. Although he was never a militant, he was certainly an acid critic of the social and political systems of his time.

Following journeys to Tunisia in 1896 and 1904, he moved definitively to Sidi Bou Said in 1911.

In 1913, Jossot converted to Islam, taking the Muslim name Abdul Karim. Around ten years later, he followed the well-known Algerian Sufi shaykh Ahmad al-Alawi. Jossot was not the only French painter of his time to convert to Islam and Sufism: others included Ivan Aguéli and Étienne Dinet.

Writing in the Dépêche tunisienne (10 February 1913), Jossot contrasted the falseness of Western civilisation with the simplicity of Islam, and praised Islam for having "no mysteries, no dogmas, no priests, almost no ceremonies," and for being "the most rational religion in the world."

Jossot wrote several booklets, titled Ma Conversion, Le Sentier d'Allah and Le Foetus récalcitrant where he tried to compile and resume more than hundred articles scattered in French and Tunisian newspapers. There we can read  his individualistic philosophy close to Georges Darien, Georges Palante, or even Jiddu Krishnamurti, his metaphysical convictions, his anticlericalism and pacifist engagement during the two world wars, his fight against abuses of colonisation.

Jossot continued to draw caricature and to paint in the Orientalist style, and died in Sidi Bou Said in 1951. He received a simple civil burial. Just before his death Jossot confided in an unpublished memoirs titled Goutte à goutte : 
" au fond du trou-terminus, nous roupillerons profondément, sans faire de cauchemars et nous ne nous réveillerons jamais. "

Pour ma part, si j'avais la liberté de choisir, ce serait cette dernière hypothèse qui aurait ma préférence : cesser d'être, ne plus rien voir, ne plus entendre, ne plus rien sentir ! Les hommes me foutant enfin la Paix avec le Repos Eternel par dessus le marché ! C'est la grâce que je me souhaite !"

References

Sources
 E.Bénézit: "Dictionnaire critique et documentaire des Peintres,  Sculpteurs,  Dessinateurs et Graveurs -nouvelle édition:Jaques Busse" Paris, Gründ 1999.
 Marie Bouchard: « Henri Gustave Jossot » in: "Bulletin du Club Français de la Médaille" no 70-71 Paris, 1er trimestre, 1981
 Michel Dixmier, « Jossot », Cahier de l'art mineur, n° 23, Paris, Vent du Ch'min et Limage, 1980.
 Henri Viltard, « Jossot, Caricaturiste malgré lui », Actes du colloque de Brest 13-15 mai 2004, « Peinture et Caricature », Ridiculosa, n° 11, 2004.
 Henri Viltard, « Jossot (1866-1951), Un caricaturiste libre-penseur et musulman », Recherches en Histoire de l’Art, n° 5, 2006.
 Henri Viltard, « Abdou-‘l-Karim Jossot : polémiques d’un renégat en Tunisie », Revue de l’Institut des belles-lettres arabes (IBLA), n° 201, 2008.
 Henri Viltard, « Gros méchant : Jossot et l’image discriminante » in CSERGO (Julia) dir., Trop gros ? L'obésité et ses représentations, édition Autrement, 2009.
 Henri Viltard, « Jossot : portraits d'un roumi chez les « Néo-civilisés » », dans A. M. Granet-Abisset, D. Rigaux, Image de soi, image de l'autre. Du portrait individuel aux représentations collectives, publications de la MSH-Alpes, Grenoble, avril 2010, 318 p.
 Gustave Jossot, Le Foetus récalcitrant, présenté et annoté par Henri Viltard, Finitude, 2011, 128 p.

Further reading

 David Sweetman: "Explosive Acts: Toulouse-Lautrec, Oscar Wilde, Félix Fénéon and the Art & Anarchy of the Fin de Siécle" New York, Simon & Schuster 1999
 Roger Shattuck: "The Banquet Years: The origins of the Avant-garde in France, 1885 to World War I" U.S.A., Vintage Books 1968
 http://www.culture.gouv.fr/public/mistral/joconde_fr?ACTION=CHERCHER&FIELD_98=UTIL&VALUE_98=%20Jockey-Club&DOM=All&REL_SPECIFIC=1

External links
 Assiette au beurre: Jossot (french)
 Les Amis du Cheikh Ahhmed al-Alawi: Jossot (french)
 Jossot's cartoons
 Goutte à goutte, Le site de Jossot with an English page for the biography

1866 births
1951 deaths
19th-century French painters
20th-century French painters
20th-century French male artists
Converts to Islam
French comics artists
French illustrators
French male painters
French Muslims
Orientalist painters
19th-century French male artists